I Am Chipmunk is the debut album by British rapper Chipmunk, released on 9 October 2009 by Columbia Records. Unknown to many, the album was originally scheduled to have been released the year before: one being 4 May and the other release date being October. It produced four consecutive top 10 singles, including one chart-topper. The album was deemed a success after it debuted at No. 2 on the UK Albums Chart

In-line with its record sales, a new platinum edition of the album was released on 3 May 2010 featuring four new songs, including new single "Until You Were Gone" featuring Dutch singer-songwriter Esmée Denters.

Singles 
 "Beast" was the first single taken from I Am Chipmunk and featured Loick Essien on guest vocals. It reached No. 181 on the UK Singles Chart following its release on 8 December 2008.
 "Chip Diddy Chip" was released as the second single from the album on 16 January 2009. The single peaked at No. 21 on the UK Singles Chart and marked Chipmunk's breakthrough.
 "Diamond Rings" was released as the third single on 6 July 2009 and featured vocals from upcoming Scottish R&B singer Emeli Sandé. The single peaked at No. 6 in the UK, marking Chipmunk's first top 10 hit. 
"Oopsy Daisy" was released as the fourth official single on 4 October 2009 and featured vocals from Dayo Olatunji. The single went on to top the UK Singles Chart, marking Chipmunk's first No. 1 single, but also his second consecutive top 10 hit.
"Look for Me" featuring vocals from Talay Riley was released as the fifth single from the album on 28 December 2009. The single marked Chipmunk's third consecutive top 10 hit when it managed to peak at No. 7 in the UK. 
 "Until You Were Gone" served as the sixth official single to be released and the first and only single to be released from the Platinum Edition reissue of the album. The single featured vocals from Dutch pop/R&B singer Esmée Denters and was released on 19 April 2010, where it debuted at No. 3, marking Chipmunk's fourth consecutive top 10 hit and his second most successful single behind "Oopsy Daisy".

Unknown to many, "Muhammad Ali" was also meant to be a single off his album back when it was recorded in 2008. A video was also shot to support the song; whilst the visuals feature other UK artists such as Ghetts, Frisco, Scorcher and many others.

Track listing

Chart performance
I Am Chipmunk debuted on the UK Albums Chart at No. 2 on 18 October 2009 behind Editors, but beating off new competition from Shakira, The Saturdays and Taio Cruz who reached No. 4, 9 and 14 respectively. In its second week on the chart, the album fell 6 places to No. 8. The album spent 8 weeks in the Top 40 albums, before falling to No. 41 on 22 December 2009.

Chipmunk chose to re-release the album, with 4 extra tracks, including "Until You Were Gone", the lead single from the re-release. The album re-entered the Top 40 on 9 May 2010 at No. 11, before falling out of the Top 40 on 2 July the next month.

Weekly charts

Year-end charts

Certifications

Release history

Standard edition

Platinum edition

References

2009 debut albums
Chipmunk (rapper) albums
Columbia Records albums
Albums produced by Naughty Boy
Albums produced by Harmony Samuels